Techatticup Mine, is a former gold mine, now a tourist attraction.

History
The Techatticup Mine was the largest and most productive mine in the Colorado Mining District.  The mining camps of Alturas and Louisville were located near this mine, midway down the canyon.

Today
The mine has been cleaned up and illuminated, and guided tours can be taken through the mine.  Much of the old mining equipment is still to be seen there.  A highlight of the tour is where it passes through a spectacular example of drift mining, its long deep drift cut downward from the top through the mountain where its lode of ore was located.

References

Geography of Clark County, Nevada
Tourist attractions in Clark County, Nevada
Nevada in the American Civil War
Gold mines in Nevada
History of Clark County, Nevada
Historic sites in Nevada